Huashanzhen railway station is an underground railway station located in Huadu District, Guangzhou, Guangdong, China. It opened with the Eastern section of the Guangzhou–Foshan circular intercity railway on 30 November 2020.

References 

Railway stations in Guangdong
Railway stations in China opened in 2020